Nancy L. Wicker is professor of art history at the University of Mississippi. She was previously professor in the department of art at Minnesota State University, Mankato.

Career
Wicker graduated BA with High Honors from Eastern Illinois University, majoring in art history and studio art, in 1975. She took her MA in art history from the University of Minnesota in 1979, followed by her Ph.D. also from Minnesota in 1990, with work on interdisciplinary art history, archaeology, and Germanic philology. In 1988 she was awarded the Aurora Borealis Prize of the Society for the Advancement of Scandinavian Study.

She was appointed an assistant professor in the department of art at Minnesota State University, Mankato, in 1990, promoted to associate professor in 1995, and then professor in 2000. Since 2003 she has been professor of art history at the University of Mississippi. She was visiting professor at Uppsala University.

Wicker is a specialist in the function of jewellery in the Early Medieval period in Europe and  gender and archaeology about which she has edited three books, including Gender and the Archaeology of Death (2001).

She has been president of the Society of Historians of Scandinavia, an interest group within the Society for the Advancement of Scandinavian Study.

Selected publications

Books
Situating Gender in European Archaeologies. Archaeolingua Press, 2010. (Editor with Live Helga Dommasnes, Tove Hjørungdal, Sandra Montón Subías, and Margarita Sánchez Romero) 
Gender and the archaeology of death. AltaMira Press, 2001. (Editor with Bettina Arnold) 
From the ground up: Beyond gender theory in archaeology: proceedings of the Fifth Gender and Archaeology Conference, University of Wisconsin-Milwaukee, October 1998. Archaeopress, Oxford, 1999. (Editor with Bettina Arnold) (British Archaeological Reports)

Articles and contributions to edited books

“Bridging the Gap: Managing a Digital Medieval Initiative Across Disciplines and Institutions,” with Joseph Koivisto and Lilla Kopár, pp. 223–240 in Meeting the Medieval in a Digital World, edited by Mathew Evan Davis, Tamsyn Mahoney-Steel and Ece Turnator. Medieval Media Cultures. Leeds: ARC Medieval Press/Medieval Institute Publications. , 
“Decolonizing Gold Bracteates: From Late Roman Medallions to Scandinavian Migration Period Pendants,” pp. 17–36 in Postcolonising the Medieval Image, edited by Eva Frojmovic and Catherine Karkov. London: Routledge (Taylor & Francis), 2017. 
“The Reception of Figurative Art beyond the Frontier: Scandinavian Encounters with Roman Numismatic Imagery,” pp. 243–256 in Rome and the Worlds Beyond Roman Frontiers: The Eleventh Workshop of the International Network Impact of Empire, edited by Danielle Slootjes and Michael Peachin. Impact of Empire 21. Leiden: Brill, 2016. 
“Women in the Roman Iron Age (A.D. 0–400) in Scandinavia,” pp. 1027–1036 in Women in Antiquity: Real Women Across the Ancient World, edited by Stephanie Lynn Budin and Jean MacIntosh Turfa. Rewriting Antiquity. London: Routledge, 2016. 
“Roman Medallions in Scandinavia: Shifting Contexts of Space, Time, and Meaning,” pp. 232–247 in Beyond Boundaries: Connecting Visual Cultures in the Roman Provinces, edited by Susan Alcock, Mariana Egri, and James F. D. Frakes. Los Angeles: Getty Publications, 2016. 
 “Bracteate Inscriptions and Context Analysis in the Light of Alternatives to Hauck’s Iconographic Interpretations,” Futhark: International Journal of Runic Studies 5, 2014 (2015): 25–43. 
 “Inspiring the Barbarians? The Transformation from Roman Medallions to Scandinavian Bracteates,” pp. 105–120 in Rome Beyond the Imperial Frontiers: Imports, Attitudes, and Practices (Journal of Roman Archaeology Supplementary Series 94), edited by Peter S. Wells. Portsmouth RI: Journal of Roman Archaeology, 2013. , 
 “Bracteates and Runes,” with Henrik Williams, Futhark: International Journal of Runic Studies 3, 2012 (2013): 151–213. 
 “The Elusive Smith,” pp. 29–36 in Goldsmith Mysteries: Archaeological, Pictorial and Documentary Evidence from the 1st Millennium AD in Northern Europe (Schriften des Archäologischen Landesmuseums, Ergänzungsreihe 8), edited by Alexandra Pesch and Ruth Blankenfeldt. Neumünster: Wachholtz, 2012. 
 “Nimble-fingered Maidens in Scandinavia: Women as Artists and Patrons,” pp. 865–902 in Reassessing Women’s Roles as ‘Makers’ of Medieval Art and Architecture, vol. 2, edited by Therèse Martin. Leiden: Brill, 2012.  (print),  (e-book)
 “Christianization, Female Infanticide, and the Abundance of Female Burials at Viking Age Birka in Sweden,” Journal of the History of Sexuality 21:2 (2012): 245–262. 
 “‘The Four Smiths’ and the Replication of Bracteate Techniques,” pp. 33–44 in Det 61. Internationale Sachsensymposion 2010 in Haderslev, Danmark(Arkæologi i Slesvig/Archäologie in Schleswig, Sonderband) edited by Linda Boye et al., Neumünster: Wachholtz, 2011. ,  (Wachholtz Verlag)
 “Would There Have Been Gothic Art without the Vikings? The Contribution of Scandinavian Medieval Art,” Medieval Encounters 17 (2011): 198–229.  (print),  (online). Reprinted as pp. 198–229 in Confronting the Borders of Medieval Art, edited by Jill Caskey, Adam S. Cohen, and Linda Safran. Leiden: Brill, 2011. 
 "The Scandinavian Animal Styles in Response to Mediterranean and Christian Narrative Art", at pp. 531–550 in The Cross Goes North: Processes of Conversion in Northern Europe, AD 300-1300, edited by Martin Carver. York: York Medieval Press, University of York, 2003,

References 

American art historians
Scandinavian studies scholars
Year of birth missing (living people)
Living people
American social sciences writers
American women academics
University of Mississippi faculty
University of Minnesota College of Liberal Arts alumni
Eastern Illinois University alumni
Society for the Advancement of Scandinavian Study
20th-century American non-fiction writers
21st-century American non-fiction writers
20th-century American women writers
21st-century American women writers
Women art historians
American women historians
Minnesota State University, Mankato faculty